Matías Jesús Noble (born 9 August 1996) is an Argentine professional footballer who plays as a midfielder for Brown de Adrogué.

Career
Noble started his youth career with Gimnasia y Esgrima in 2007, making the step into senior football in 2015. He was an unused substitute for Argentine Primera División matches against Tigre and Rosario Central in August 2015, prior to making his senior debut on 5 February 2016 in a defeat to Banfield. Twelve more appearances followed in 2016 which ended with serious injury, before Noble played four times in 2016–17. On 30 June 2018, Noble completed move to Quilmes of Primera B Nacional. After two years at Quilmes, Noble moved to fellow league club Brown de Adrogué in October 2020.

Career statistics
.

References

External links

1996 births
Living people
People from Berisso
Argentine footballers
Association football midfielders
Argentine Primera División players
Primera Nacional players
Club de Gimnasia y Esgrima La Plata footballers
Quilmes Atlético Club footballers
Club Atlético Brown footballers
Sportspeople from Buenos Aires Province